Porocephalus crotali is a parasitic crustacean from the group Pentastomida, also known as tongue worms.

Morphology
Porocephalus crotali is cylindrical and annulated (having ring-like segments) with 38–40 body segments, a digestive system, centrally located mouth surrounded by four hooks making it seem like it has five mouths — hence the name “pentastomes” .

Life cycle
Mammals are the intermediate hosts and snakes are the definitive hosts.

Once the larva is released from the egg, it enters the duodenal mucosa of the host. It takes about an hour from the time the egg is swallowed to the time there is complete entrance into the host. After entering the duodenal mucosa, the larvae travel to the abdominal cavity where it takes a week until the larvae molt is encapsulated in the host tissue. During a three-month period, the parasite continues to molt five more times in which the size increases and the body becomes segmented. The sex of the parasite can be determined after the fifth molt. When the sixth molt is complete, the nymphs become encapsulated and dormant. If a snake eats the nymph, the nymph loses its dormancy and quickly enters the intestinal wall of the snake where it travels to the lungs. They then feed on the blood and tissue fluids in the lungs until they reach maturity.

Disease 

The larval stages in the nymph may cause visceral pentastomiasis in humans . Visceral pentastomiasis has been reported from Africa, Malaysia and the Middle East.

References 

Parasitic crustaceans
Maxillopoda
Crustaceans described in 1808